The Show: The Soundtrack is the soundtrack to Brian Robbins' 1995 film The Show. It was released on August 15, 1995 through Def Jam Recordings, and consists of hip hop music.

Track listing

Charts

Weekly charts

Year-end charts

Certifications

See also
List of number-one R&B albums of 1995 (U.S.)

References

External links

1995 soundtrack albums
Hip hop soundtracks
Def Jam Recordings soundtracks
Albums produced by Prodeje
Albums produced by Ty Fyffe
Albums produced by Warren G
Albums produced by Sean Combs
Albums produced by Easy Mo Bee
Albums produced by Erick Sermon
Albums produced by Q-Tip (musician)
Documentary film soundtracks